USS Houston (SSN-713), a  attack submarine, was the fourth ship of the United States Navy to be named for Houston, Texas. The contract to build her was awarded to Newport News Shipbuilding and Dry Dock Company in Newport News, Virginia on 1 August 1975 and her keel was laid down on 29 January 1979. She was launched on 21 March 1981 sponsored by Barbara Bush, wife of then Vice-President of the United States George H. W. Bush. Houston was commissioned on 25 September 1982.

History

Author Robert D. Kaplan embedded aboard the ship in the spring of 2005 and recounted his experiences in her for his book Hog Pilots, Blue Water Grunts in Chapter Four "Geeks with Tattoos: The Most Driven Men I have Ever Known."

2008 radiation leak 
On 1 August 2008 the Navy reported to CNN that Houston was found to have been leaking radioactive water for months while on patrol and visiting stations in Japan, Guam and Hawaii.  The problem was discovered the previous month during servicing at Pearl Harbor. One crewman was exposed to radioactive water but not injured. The Navy reported that the Houstons leak released only a "negligible" amount of radioactivity. The Navy later expanded the estimated time the leak existed to nearly two years, although they maintained the amount of radioactivity leaked was very small – "less than a smoke detector".

Final deployment
On 28 October 2015, Houston moored in Pearl Harbor, after completing her final scheduled deployment. She was decommissioned on 26 August 2016 in a ceremony at Naval Base Kitsap—Bangor.

References

External links 

 Official website for USS Houston
 
 Ship casualty reports for USS Houston
 USS Houston (SSN 713)

Los Angeles-class submarines
Cold War submarines of the United States
Nuclear submarines of the United States Navy
1981 ships
Ships built in Newport News, Virginia